Demons Are a Girl's Best Friend is the fourth album by the Danish psychobilly band the Nekromantix, released in 1996 by Nervous Records. It was the band's last album to include drummer Tim Kristensen (credited as Grim Tim Hansdsome), and only album to include guitarist Søren Munk Petersen. After both members left the group, original guitarist Peter Sandorff returned to the lineup and brought in his brother Kristian as drummer. The CD and LP versions of the album were released with different covers, and the LP also included the "Demons Are a Girl's Best Friend" single. The album was re-released in 2002 with new artwork and two bonus tracks.

Track listing
All songs written by Gaarde/Kristensen/Petersen except where indicated.
"Demons Are a Girl's Best Friend" – 4:36
"Night Nurse" – 3:49
"Love at First Bite" (Gaarde/Johansen/Kristensen/Petersen) – 4:33
"Always and Never" (Gaarde/Kristensen/Petersen/Westh) – 4:30
"Last Night I Saved an Angel" – 3:57
"Alive" – 3:41
"Sexton Society" – 4:13
"Beelzebub" – 3:27
"Sea of Red" – 4:39
"Technicolor Nightmare" – 4:24
"Hypnotized" – 3:52
"Wanted" – 5:02

Performers
Kim Nekroman - double bass, vocals
Søren Munk Petersen - guitar, backing vocals
Grim Tim Handsome (Tim Kristensen) - drums

Album information
Record label: Record Music DK
songs written by Gaarde/Kristensen/Petersen except "Love at First Bite" by Gaarde/Johansen/Kristensen/Petersen, and "Always and Never" by Gaarde/Kristensen/Petersen/Westh.
Engineered by Jan Eliasson
Original cover design by März

Nekromantix albums
1996 albums